DXQS (98.3 FM), broadcasting as DWIZ 98.3, is a radio station owned and operated by Aliw Broadcasting Corporation. The station's studio and transmitter are located at G/F Atasha Hotel & Dormitory, #8 Sampaguita St., Dadiangas East, General Santos.

The station was formerly under the Home Radio network from its inception in 2000 to January 16, 2023. On January 30, 2023, it, along with its provincial stations, was relaunched under the DWIZ network.

References

Aliw Broadcasting Corporation
Home Radio Network
Radio stations in General Santos
Radio stations established in 2000